255P/Levy, formerly P/2006 T1 and P/2011 Y1, is a periodic comet with an orbital period of 5.25 years. It last came to perihelion (closest approach to the Sun) on 14 January 2012. During the 2006 passage the comet achieved an apparent magnitude of ~9.5. Levy (PK06T010) was believed to have been recovered on 3 June 2011 at magnitude 19.8, but other observatories were unable to confirm a recovery. It was most likely a false positive because of large residuals. Levy was recovered on 17 December 2011 at magnitude 19.8, and given the second designation 2011 Y1. It was then numbered.

It came to perihelion on 14 January 2012 at a distance of 1.007 AU from the Sun. During the 2012 passage the comet was originally expected to reach an apparent magnitude of 7, but the comet had been in outburst in 2006 and was much dimmer than expected when it was recovered in 2011. MPC estimates after the 2011 recovery estimated that it would reach a magnitude of 17, and it had an elongation of 90°. However, CCD images showed it was diffuse and the comet's magnitude was estimated at 14.1 on 30 December 2011.

The comet was not observed during the 2017 perihelion passage. At opposition in August 2016 it would have been dimmer than magnitude 19.

References

External links 
 Orbital simulation from JPL (Java) / Horizons Ephemeris
 Elements and Ephemeris for 255P/Levy – Minor Planet Center
 P/2006 T1 (Levy) at the Minor Planet Center's Database
 255P/Levy - Seiichi Yoshida @ aerith.net (with pictures taken by different astronomers around the world)
 P/2006 T1 (Levy) as seen at the Great Shefford Observatory in 2006

Periodic comets
255P
0255
255P Levy
Comets in 2017
20061002